Temple Sowerby railway station was a railway station 
situated on the Eden Valley Railway between Penrith and Kirkby Stephen East. It served the village of Temple Sowerby. The station opened to passenger traffic on 9 June 1862, and closed on 7 December 1953. It is now a private residence.

References

 
 
 

Disused railway stations in Cumbria
Former North Eastern Railway (UK) stations
Railway stations in Great Britain opened in 1862
Railway stations in Great Britain closed in 1953
1862 establishments in England
1953 disestablishments in England